David Timothy Gibson  (born 1950s) is the founder of New Zealand film production company The Gibson Group. After its sale in 2013 to his business partners, he was appointed CEO of the New Zealand Film Commission.

Early life
Gibson was born in Pahiatua to Christabel Gibson, a schoolteacher and later lecturer, and David Maurice Gibson, a farmer. He studied at St Patrick's College, Silverstream, a boy's boarding college in Upper Hutt. He began a teaching degree at Wellington College of Education in Karori, but left after six weeks for a degree at Victoria University of Wellington in education and English. During this time, Gibson started experimenting with film. He purchased a Super 8 film camera and began filming his friends at concerts and producing short pieces for the University's Drama Society.

Career
While still enrolled at Victoria University, Gibson began part-time work for the New Zealand Broadcasting Corporation. This mainly involved labour, moving sets from Avalon Studios in Lower Hutt to the corporation's Waring Taylor Street locations.
 
In 1977, Gibson left his degree unfinished and established Gibson Films, in a rented office on Courtenay Place in Wellington. He began mining the genre of educational films, which he would then sell to schools and educational film distributors. One early piece about two children living on a high country sheep station sold to Encyclopædia Britannica.
 
In the 1980s Gibson Films rebranded to The Gibson Group, and their genre offering widened. Early productions included The Silent One, an adaptation of the Joy Cowley novel of the same name, filmed entirely on the small island of Aitutaki in the Pacific. It was also the first New Zealand feature film directed solely by a woman. During this period, sketch comedy also became one of the mediums Gibson Group became known for. Satirical puppet show Public Eye, inspired by the UK show Spitting Image, proved popular despite having to be toned down for New Zealand audiences. Other genres included magazine-style shows The Edge (1993–94), Sunday (1995–97), B@ckchat''' (1998–2000) and Frontseat (2004–2007). 
 
Throughout the 1990s and into the 2000s, The Gibson Group broadened their mediums to work with interactive museum exhibitions both in New Zealand and overseas, including Our Space at Museum of New Zealand Te Papa Tongarewa. The popular children's shows The Simon Eliot Show and MyStory used cellphones and technology to let the audience interact with the host. MyStory was New Zealand's first show screened in a 'mobisode' format. 
 
Gibson's other notable productions include two natural disaster dramas for television. Aftershock (2008), an earthquake drama accompanied by a documentary and website about earthquake safety. This was followed by Eruption (2010), set in Auckland's volcanic landscape.

In the 2012 Queen's Birthday and Diamond Jubilee Honours, Gibson was appointed an Officer of the New Zealand Order of Merit, for services to the film and television industry.
 
In 2013, Gibson was appointed CEO of the New Zealand Film Commission. During his tenure the commission granted funding for successful New Zealand films such as Tickled, Poi E: The Story of Our Song, Mahana, and Pork Pie''.

Gibson is currently a board member of the Wellington Regional Economic Development Agency.
 
In June 2017, Gibson announced that he would be stepping down from the role of CEO. In a statement, Gibson said "I've thoroughly enjoyed the last few years but have always believed CEO's  shouldn't stay too long in organisations like the NZFC. I'm not sure what I'll do next."

Filmography

Television 
The numbers in writing credits refer to the number of episodes.

Executive producer-only

References

New Zealand film producers
New Zealand television producers
New Zealand television directors
1950s births
Living people
People from Pahiatua
New Zealand chief executives
Officers of the New Zealand Order of Merit
People educated at St. Patrick's College, Silverstream
Victoria University of Wellington alumni